Greg Stewart is an Australian triathlon and duathlon champion from Highton. He is two times Australian champion in triathlon and two times Australiam champion in duathlon.

Since 1983 he competes in triathlon. His first success was in 1986 When he won the Australian championship in intermediate distance triathlon. In 1987 he became third at the Ironman World Championship. Stewart has been a triathlon coach for more than 20 years and has been selector for the Australian team for four years.

Titles 
 Australian Champion in intermediate distance triathlon: 1986
 Australian Champion in sprint distance triathlon: 1993
 Australian Champion in duathlon: 1993, 1996

Notable ranks

Triathlon 
 1985: 15th at Ironman World Championship - 9:53.23
 1986: 5th at Ironman World Championship - 9:05.10
 1986: 3rd at Ironman Japan
 1987: 5th at Nice Triathlon, France
 1987: 3rd at Ironman World Championship - 8:58:53
 1989: 5th at ITU World Championship
 1990: 6th at ITU World Championship

Notes

References 

 Greg Stewart at Geelong Triathlonclub
 Greg Stewart profile at the-sports.org

Australian male triathletes
Living people
Year of birth missing (living people)
20th-century Australian people
Sportspeople from Geelong
Sportsmen from Victoria (Australia)
Triathlon coaches